The partition of Ireland was the process by which the Government of the United Kingdom of Great Britain and Ireland  divided Ireland into two self-governing polities: Northern Ireland and Southern Ireland. It was enacted on 3 May 1921 under the Government of Ireland Act 1920. The Act intended both territories to remain within the United Kingdom and contained provisions for their eventual reunification. The smaller Northern Ireland was duly created with a devolved government (Home Rule) and remained part of the UK. The larger Southern Ireland was not recognised by most of its citizens, who instead recognised the self-declared 32-county Irish Republic. On 6 December 1922, a year after the signing of the Anglo-Irish Treaty, the territory of Southern Ireland left the UK and became the Irish Free State, now the Republic of Ireland.

The territory that became Northern Ireland, within the Irish province of Ulster, had a Protestant and Unionist majority who wanted to maintain ties to Britain. This was largely due to 17th-century British colonisation. However, it also had a significant minority of Catholics and Irish nationalists. The rest of Ireland had a Catholic, nationalist majority who wanted self-governance or independence. The Irish Home Rule movement compelled the British government to introduce bills that would give Ireland a devolved government within the UK (home rule). This led to the Home Rule Crisis (1912–14), when Ulster unionists/loyalists founded a paramilitary movement, the Ulster Volunteers, to prevent Ulster being ruled by an Irish government. The British government proposed to exclude all or part of Ulster, but the crisis was interrupted by the First World War (1914–18). Support for Irish independence grew during the war.

Irish republican party Sinn Féin won the vast majority of Irish seats in the 1918 election. They formed a separate Irish parliament and declared an independent Irish Republic covering the whole island. This led to the Irish War of Independence (1919–21), a guerrilla conflict between the Irish Republican Army (IRA) and British forces. In 1920 the British government introduced another bill to create two devolved governments: one for six northern counties (Northern Ireland) and one for the rest of the island (Southern Ireland). This was passed as the Government of Ireland Act, and came into force as a fait accompli on 3 May 1921. Following the 1921 elections, Ulster unionists formed a Northern Ireland government. A Southern government was not formed, as republicans recognised the Irish Republic instead. During 1920–22, in what became Northern Ireland, partition was accompanied by violence "in defence or opposition to the new settlement" – see The Troubles in Northern Ireland (1920–1922). The capital, Belfast, saw "savage and unprecedented" communal violence, mainly between Protestant and Catholic civilians. More than 500 were killed and more than 10,000 became refugees, most of them from the Catholic minority.

The War of Independence resulted in a truce in July 1921 and led to the Anglo-Irish Treaty that December. Under the Treaty, the territory of Southern Ireland would leave the UK and become the Irish Free State. Northern Ireland's parliament could vote it in or out of the Free State, and a commission could then redraw or confirm the provisional border. In early 1922, the IRA launched a failed offensive into border areas of Northern Ireland. The Northern government chose to remain in the UK. The Boundary Commission proposed small changes to the border in 1925, but they were not implemented.

Since partition, Irish nationalists/republicans continue to seek a united independent Ireland, while Ulster unionists/loyalists want Northern Ireland to remain in the UK. The Unionist governments of Northern Ireland were accused of discrimination against the Irish nationalist and Catholic minority. A campaign to end discrimination was opposed by loyalists who said it was a republican front. This sparked the Troubles (c. 1969–1998), a thirty-year conflict in which more than 3,500 people were killed. Under the 1998 Good Friday Agreement, the Irish and British governments and the main parties agreed to a power-sharing government in Northern Ireland, and that the status of Northern Ireland would not change without the consent of a majority of its population. The treaty also reaffirmed an open border between both jurisdictions.

Background

Irish Home Rule movement

During the 19th century, the Irish nationalist Home Rule movement campaigned for Ireland to have self-government while remaining part of the United Kingdom. The nationalist Irish Parliamentary Party won most Irish seats in the 1885 general election. It then held the balance of power in the British House of Commons, and entered into an alliance with the Liberals. IPP leader Charles Stewart Parnell convinced British Prime Minister William Gladstone to introduce the First Irish Home Rule Bill in 1886. Protestant unionists in Ireland opposed the Bill, fearing industrial decline and religious persecution of Protestants by a Catholic-dominated Irish government. English Conservative politician Lord Randolph Churchill proclaimed: "the Orange card is the one to play", in reference to the Protestant Orange Order. The belief was later expressed in the popular slogan, "Home Rule means Rome Rule". Partly in reaction to the Bill, there were riots in Belfast, as Protestant unionists attacked the city's Catholic nationalist minority. The Bill was defeated in the Commons.

Gladstone introduced a Second Irish Home Rule Bill in 1892. The Irish Unionist Alliance had been formed to oppose home rule, and the Bill sparked mass unionist protests. In response, Liberal Unionist leader Joseph Chamberlain called for a separate provincial government for Ulster where Protestant unionists were a majority. Irish unionists assembled at conventions in Dublin and Belfast to oppose both the Bill and the proposed partition. The unionist MP Horace Plunkett, who would later support home rule, opposed it in the 1890s because of the dangers of partition. Although the Bill was approved by the Commons, it was defeated in the House of Lords.

Home Rule Crisis

Following the December 1910 election, the Irish Parliamentary Party again agreed to support a Liberal government if it introduced another home rule bill. The Parliament Act 1911 meant the House of Lords could no longer veto bills passed by the Commons, but only delay them for up to two years. British Prime Minister H. H. Asquith introduced the Third Home Rule Bill in April 1912. Unionists opposed the Bill, but argued that if Home Rule could not be stopped then all or part of Ulster should be excluded from it. Irish nationalists opposed partition, although some were willing to accept Ulster having some self-governance within a self-governing Ireland ("Home Rule within Home Rule"). Winston Churchill made his feelings about the possibility of the partition of Ireland clear: "Whatever Ulster's right may be, she cannot stand in the way of the whole of the rest of Ireland. Half a province cannot impose a permanent veto on the nation. Half a province cannot obstruct forever the reconciliation between the British and Irish democracies." In September 1912, more than 500,000 Unionists signed the Ulster Covenant, pledging to oppose Home Rule by any means and to defy any Irish government. They founded a large paramilitary movement, the Ulster Volunteers, to prevent Ulster becoming part of a self-governing Ireland. They also threatened to establish a Provisional Ulster Government. In response, Irish nationalists founded the Irish Volunteers to ensure Home Rule was implemented. The Ulster Volunteers smuggled 25,000 rifles and three million rounds of ammunition into Ulster from the German Empire, in the Larne gun-running of April 1914. The Irish Volunteers also smuggled weaponry from Germany in the Howth gun-running that July. Ireland seemed to be on the brink of civil war. Three border boundary options were proposed.

On 20 March 1914, in the "Curragh incident", many of the highest-ranking British Army officers in Ireland threatened to resign rather than deploy against the Ulster Volunteers. This meant that the British government could legislate for Home Rule but could not be sure of implementing it. In May 1914, the British government introduced an Amending Bill to allow for 'Ulster' to be excluded from Home Rule. There was then debate over how much of Ulster should be excluded and for how long, and whether to hold referendums in each county. Some Ulster unionists were willing to tolerate the 'loss' of some mainly-Catholic areas of the province. In July 1914, King George V called the Buckingham Palace Conference to allow Unionists and Nationalists to come together and discuss the issue of partition, but the conference achieved little.

First World War
The Home Rule Crisis was interrupted by the outbreak of the First World War in August 1914, and Ireland's involvement in it. Asquith abandoned his Amending Bill, and instead rushed through a new bill, the Suspensory Act 1914, which received Royal Assent together with the Home Rule Bill (now Government of Ireland Act 1914) on 18 September 1914. The Suspensory Act ensured that Home Rule would be postponed for the duration of the war with the exclusion of Ulster still to be decided.

During the First World War, support grew for full Irish independence, which had been advocated by Irish republicans. In April 1916, republicans took the opportunity of the war to launch a rebellion against British rule, the Easter Rising. It was crushed after a week of heavy fighting in Dublin. The harsh British reaction to the Rising fuelled support for independence, with republican party Sinn Féin winning four by-elections in 1917.

The British parliament called the Irish Convention in an attempt to find a solution to its Irish Question. It sat in Dublin from July 1917 until March 1918, and comprised both Irish nationalist and Unionist politicians. It ended with a report, supported by nationalist and southern unionist members, calling for the establishment of an all-Ireland parliament consisting of two houses with special provisions for Ulster unionists. The report was, however, rejected by the Ulster unionist members, and Sinn Féin had not taken part in the proceedings, meaning the convention was a failure.

In 1918, the British government attempted to impose conscription in Ireland and argued there could be no Home Rule without it. This sparked outrage in Ireland and further galvanised support for the republicans.

1918 General Election, Long Committee, Violence  

In the December 1918 general election, Sinn Féin won the overwhelming majority of Irish seats. In line with their manifesto, Sinn Féin's elected members boycotted the British parliament and founded a separate Irish parliament (Dáil Éireann), declaring an independent Irish Republic covering the whole island. Unionists, however, won most seats in northeastern Ulster and affirmed their continuing loyalty to the United Kingdom. Many Irish republicans blamed the British establishment for the sectarian divisions in Ireland, and believed that Ulster Unionist defiance would fade once British rule was ended.

The British authorities outlawed the Dáil in September 1919, and a guerrilla conflict developed as the Irish Republican Army (IRA) began attacking British forces. This became known as the Irish War of Independence.

Long Committee - Six or Nine Counties
In September 1919, British Prime Minister David Lloyd George tasked a committee with planning Home Rule for Ireland within the UK. Headed by English Unionist politician Walter Long, it was known as the 'Long Committee'. The makeup of the committee was Unionist in outlook and had no Nationalist representatives as members. James Craig (the future 1st Prime Minister of Northern Ireland) and his associates were the only Irishmen consulted during this time. During the summer of 1919, Long visited Ireland several times, using his yacht as a meeting place to discuss the "Irish question" with the Lord Lieutenant of Ireland John French and the Chief Secretary for Ireland Ian Macpherson.

Prior to the first meeting of the committee, Long sent a memorandum to the British Prime Minister recommending two parliaments for Ireland (24 September 1919). That memorandum formed the basis of the legislation that partitioned Ireland - the Government of Ireland Act 1920. At the first meeting of the committee (15 October 1919) it was decided that two devolved governments should be established — one for the nine counties of Ulster and one for the rest of Ireland, together with a Council of Ireland for the "encouragement of Irish unity". The Long Committee felt that the nine-county proposal "will enormously minimise the partition issue...it minimises the division of Ireland on purely religious lines. The two religions would not be unevenly balanced in the Parliament of Northern Ireland." Most northern unionists wanted the territory of the Ulster government to be reduced to six counties, so that it would have a larger Protestant/Unionist majority. Long offered the Committee members a deal - "that the Six Counties ... should be theirs for good ... and no interference with the boundaries". This left large areas of Northern Ireland with populations that supported either Irish Home Rule or the establishment of an all-Ireland Republic. The results from the last all-Ireland election (the 1918 Irish general election) showed Nationalist majorities in the envisioned Northern Ireland: Counties Tyrone and Fermanagh, Londonderry City and the Constituencies of Armagh South, Belfast Falls and Down South.  

Many Unionists feared that the territory would not last if it included too many Catholics and Irish Nationalists but any reduction in size would make the state unviable. The six counties of Antrim, Down, Armagh, Londonderry, Tyrone and Fermanagh comprised the maximum area unionists believed they could dominate. The remaining three Counties of Ulster had large Catholic majorities: Cavan 81.5%, Donegal 78.9% and Monaghan 74.7%. On 29 March 1920 Charles Craig (son of Sir James Craig and Unionist MP for County Antrim) made a speech in the British House of Commons where he made clear the future make up of Northern Ireland: "The three Ulster counties of Monaghan, Cavan and Donegal are to be handed over to the South of Ireland Parliament. How the position of affairs in a Parliament of nine counties and in a Parliament of six counties would be is shortly this. If we had a nine counties Parliament, with 64 members, the Unionist majority would be about three or four, but in a six counties Parliament, with 52 members, the Unionist majority, would be about ten. The three excluded counties contain some 70,000 Unionists and 260,000 Sinn Feiners and Nationalists, and the addition of that large block of Sinn Feiners and Nationalists would reduce our majority to such a level that no sane man would undertake to carry on a Parliament with it. That is the position with which we were faced when we had to take the decision a few days ago as to whether we would call upon the Government to include the nine counties in the Bill or be settled with the six."

In the 1921 elections in Northern Ireland, Fermanagh - Tyrone (which was a single constituency), showed Catholic/Nationalist majorities: 54.7% Nationalist / 45.3% Unionist. In a letter dated 7 September 1921 from  Lloyd George to the President of the Irish Republic Eamon de Valera regarding Counties Fermanagh and Tyrone, the British Prime Minister stated that his government had a very weak case on the issue "of forcing these two Counties against their will" into Northern Ireland.  On 28 November 1921 both Tyrone and Fermanagh County Councils declared allegiance to the new Irish Parliament (Dail). On 2 December the Tyrone County Council publicly rejected the "...arbitrary, new-fangled, and universally unnatural boundary". They pledged to oppose the new border and to "make the fullest use of our rights to mollify it".  On 21 December 1921 the Fermanagh County Council passed the following resolution: "We, the County Council of Fermanagh, in view of the expressed desire of a large majority of people in this county, do not recognise the partition parliament in Belfast and do hereby direct our Secretary to hold no further communications with either Belfast or British Local Government Departments, and we pledge our allegiance to Dáil Éireann." Shortly afterwards both County Councils offices were seized by the Royal Irish Constabulary, the County officials expelled, and the County Councils dissolved.

Violence
In what became Northern Ireland, the process of partition was accompanied by violence, both "in defense or opposition to the new settlement". The IRA carried out attacks on British forces in the north-east, but was less active than in the south of Ireland. Protestant loyalists in the north-east attacked the Catholic minority in reprisal for IRA actions. The January and June 1920 local elections saw Irish nationalists and republicans win control of Tyrone and Fermanagh county councils, which were to become part of Northern Ireland, while Derry had its first Irish nationalist mayor. In summer 1920, sectarian violence erupted in Belfast and Derry, and there were mass burnings of Catholic property by loyalists in Lisburn and Banbridge. Loyalists drove 8,000 "disloyal" co-workers from their jobs in the Belfast shipyards, all of them either Catholics or Protestant labour activists. In his Twelfth of July speech, Unionist leader Edward Carson had called for loyalists to take matters into their own hands to defend Ulster, and had linked republicanism with socialism and the Catholic Church. In response to the expulsions and attacks on Catholics, the Dáil approved a boycott of Belfast goods and banks. The 'Belfast Boycott' was enforced by the IRA, who halted trains and lorries from Belfast and destroyed their goods. Conflict continued intermittently for two years, mostly in Belfast, which saw "savage and unprecedented" communal violence between Protestant and Catholic civilians. There was rioting, gun battles and bombings. Homes, business and churches were attacked and people were expelled from workplaces and from mixed neighbourhoods. The British Army was deployed and an Ulster Special Constabulary (USC) was formed to help the regular police. The USC was almost wholly Protestant and some of its members carried out reprisal attacks on Catholics. From 1920 to 1922, more than 500 were killed in Northern Ireland and more than 10,000 became refugees, most of them Catholics.

Government of Ireland Act 1920

The British government introduced the Government of Ireland Bill in early 1920 and it passed through the stages in the British parliament that year. It would partition Ireland and create two self-governing territories within the UK, with their own bicameral parliaments, along with a Council of Ireland comprising members of both. Northern Ireland would comprise the aforesaid six northeastern counties, while Southern Ireland would comprise the rest of the island. The Act was passed on 11 November and received royal assent in December 1920. It would come into force on 3 May 1921. Elections to the Northern and Southern parliaments were held on 24 May. Unionists won most seats in Northern Ireland. Its parliament first met on 7 June and formed its first devolved government, headed by Unionist Party leader James Craig. Republican and nationalist members refused to attend. King George V addressed the ceremonial opening of the Northern parliament on 22 June. Meanwhile, Sinn Féin won an overwhelming majority in the Southern Ireland election. They treated both as elections for Dáil Éireann, and its elected members gave allegiance to the Dáil and Irish Republic, thus rendering "Southern Ireland" dead in the water. The Southern parliament met only once and was attended by four unionists.

On 5 May 1921, the Ulster Unionist leader Sir James Craig met with the President of Sinn Féin, Éamon de Valera, in secret near Dublin. Each restated his position and nothing new was agreed. On 10 May De Valera told the Dáil that the meeting "... was of no significance". In June that year, shortly before the truce that ended the Anglo-Irish War, David Lloyd George invited the Republic's President de Valera to talks in London on an equal footing with the new Prime Minister of Northern Ireland, James Craig, which de Valera attended. De Valera's policy in the ensuing negotiations was that the future of Ulster was an Irish-British matter to be resolved between two sovereign states, and that Craig should not attend. After the truce came into effect on 11 July, the USC was demobilized (July - November 1921). Speaking after the truce Lloyd George made it clear to de Valera, 'that the achievement of a republic through negotiation was impossible'.

On 20 July, Lloyd George further declared to de Valera that:  In reply, de Valera wrote 

Speaking in the House of Commons on the day the Act passed, Joe Devlin (Nationalist Party) representing west Belfast, summed up the feelings of many Nationalists concerning partition and the setting up of a Northern Ireland Parliament while Ireland was in a deep state of unrest. Devlin stated: 

Ulster Unionist Party politician Charles Craig (the brother of Sir James Craig) made the feelings of many Unionists clear concerning the importance they placed on the passing of the Act and the establishment of a separate Parliament for Northern Ireland:

Anglo-Irish Treaty

The Irish War of Independence led to the Anglo-Irish Treaty, between the British government and representatives of the Irish Republic. Negotiations between the two sides were carried on between October to December 1921. The British delegation consisted of experienced parliamentarians/debaters such as Lloyd George, Winston Churchill, Austen Chamberlain and Lord Birkenhead, they had clear advantages over the Sinn Fein negotiators. The Treaty was signed on 6 December 1921. Under its terms, the territory of Southern Ireland would leave the United Kingdom within one year and become a self-governing dominion called the Irish Free State. The treaty was given legal effect in the United Kingdom through the Irish Free State Constitution Act 1922, and in Ireland by ratification by Dáil Éireann. Under the former Act, at 1 pm on 6 December 1922, King George V (at a meeting of his Privy Council at Buckingham Palace) signed a proclamation establishing the new Irish Free State.

Under the treaty, Northern Ireland's parliament could vote to opt out of the Free State. Under Article 12 of the Treaty, Northern Ireland could exercise its opt-out by presenting an address to the King, requesting not to be part of the Irish Free State. Once the treaty was ratified, the Houses of Parliament of Northern Ireland had one month (dubbed the Ulster month) to exercise this opt-out during which time the provisions of the Government of Ireland Act continued to apply in Northern Ireland. According to legal writer Austen Morgan, the wording of the treaty allowed the impression to be given that the Irish Free State temporarily included the whole island of Ireland, but legally the terms of the treaty applied only to the 26 counties, and the government of the Free State never had any powers—even in principle—in Northern Ireland. On 7 December 1922 the Parliament of Northern Ireland approved an address to George V, requesting that its territory not be included in the Irish Free State. This was presented to the king the following day and then entered into effect, in accordance with the provisions of Section 12 of the Irish Free State (Agreement) Act 1922. The treaty also allowed for a re-drawing of the border by a Boundary Commission.

Unionist objections to the Treaty
Sir James Craig, the Prime Minister of Northern Ireland objected to aspects of the Anglo-Irish Treaty. In a letter to Austen Chamberlain dated 14 December 1921, he stated:

Nationalist objections to the Treaty
Michael Collins had negotiated the treaty and had it approved by the cabinet, the Dáil (on 7 January 1922 by 64–57), and by the people in national elections. Regardless of this, it was unacceptable to Éamon de Valera, who led the Irish Civil War to stop it. Collins was primarily responsible for drafting the constitution of the new Irish Free State, based on a commitment to democracy and rule by the majority.

De Valera's minority refused to be bound by the result. Collins now became the dominant figure in Irish politics, leaving de Valera on the outside. The main dispute centred on the proposed status as a dominion (as represented by the Oath of Allegiance and Fidelity) for Southern Ireland, rather than as an independent all-Ireland republic, but continuing partition was a significant matter for Ulstermen like Seán MacEntee, who spoke strongly against partition or re-partition of any kind. The pro-treaty side argued that the proposed Boundary Commission would give large swathes of Northern Ireland to the Free State, leaving the remaining territory too small to be viable. In October 1922, the Irish Free State government established the North-Eastern Boundary Bureau (NEBB)  a government office which by 1925 had prepared 56 boxes of files to argue its case for areas of Northern Ireland to be transferred to the Free State.

De Valera had drafted his own preferred text of the treaty in December 1921, known as "Document No. 2". An "Addendum North East Ulster" indicates his acceptance of the 1920 partition for the time being, and of the rest of Treaty text as signed in regard to Northern Ireland:

Debate on Ulster Month
As described above, under the treaty it was provided that Northern Ireland would have a month – the "Ulster Month" – during which its Houses of Parliament could opt out of the Irish Free State. The Treaty was ambiguous on whether the month should run from the date the Anglo-Irish Treaty was ratified (in March 1922 via the Irish Free State (Agreement) Act) or the date that the Constitution of the Irish Free State was approved and the Free State established (6 December 1922).

When the Irish Free State (Agreement) Bill was being debated on 21 March 1922, amendments were proposed which would have provided that the Ulster Month would run from the passing of the Irish Free State (Agreement) Act and not the Act that would establish the Irish Free State. Essentially, those who put down the amendments wished to bring forward the month during which Northern Ireland could exercise its right to opt out of the Irish Free State. They justified this view on the basis that if Northern Ireland could exercise its option to opt out at an earlier date, this would help to settle any state of anxiety or trouble on the new Irish border. Speaking in the House of Lords, the Marquess of Salisbury argued:

The British Government took the view that the Ulster Month should run from the date the Irish Free State was established and not beforehand, Viscount Peel for the Government remarking:

Viscount Peel continued by saying the government desired that there should be no ambiguity and would to add a proviso to the Irish Free State (Agreement) Bill providing that the Ulster Month should run from the passing of the Act establishing the Irish Free State. He further noted that the Parliament of Southern Ireland had agreed with that interpretation, and that Arthur Griffith also wanted Northern Ireland to have a chance to see the Irish Free State Constitution before deciding.

Lord Birkenhead remarked in the Lords debate:

Northern Ireland opts out

The treaty "went through the motions of including Northern Ireland within the Irish Free State while offering it the provision to opt out". It was certain that Northern Ireland would exercise its opt out. The Prime Minister of Northern Ireland, Sir James Craig, speaking in the House of Commons of Northern Ireland in October 1922, said that "when the 6th of December is passed the month begins in which we will have to make the choice either to vote out or remain within the Free State." He said it was important that that choice be made as soon as possible after 6 December 1922 "in order that it may not go forth to the world that we had the slightest hesitation." On 7 December 1922, the day after the establishment of the Irish Free State, the Parliament of Northern Ireland resolved to make the following address to the King so as to opt out of the Irish Free State:

Discussion in the Parliament of the address was short. No division or vote was requested on the address, which was described as the Constitution Act and was then approved by the Senate of Northern Ireland. Craig left for London with the memorial embodying the address on the night boat that evening, 7 December 1922. King George V received it the following day.

If the Houses of Parliament of Northern Ireland had not made such a declaration, under Article 14 of the Treaty, Northern Ireland, its Parliament and government would have continued in being but the Oireachtas would have had jurisdiction to legislate for Northern Ireland in matters not delegated to Northern Ireland under the Government of Ireland Act. This never came to pass. On 13 December 1922, Craig addressed the Parliament of Northern Ireland, informing them that the King had accepted the Parliament's address and had informed the British and Free State governments.

Customs posts established
While the Irish Free State was established at the end of 1922, the Boundary Commission contemplated by the Treaty was not to meet until 1924. Things did not remain static during that gap. In April 1923, just four months after independence, the Irish Free State established customs barriers on the border. This was a significant step in consolidating the border. "While its final position was sidelined, its functional dimension was actually being underscored by the Free State with its imposition of a customs barrier".

Boundary Commission

The Anglo-Irish Treaty (signed 6 December 1921) contained a provision (Article 12) that would establish a boundary commission, which would determine the border "...in accordance with the wishes of the inhabitants, so far as may be compatible with economic and geographic conditions...". In October 1922 the Irish Free State government set up the North East Boundary Bureau to prepare its case for the Boundary Commission. The Bureau conducted extensive work but the Commission refused to consider its work, which amounted to 56 boxes of files. Most leaders in the Free State, both pro- and anti-treaty, assumed that the commission would award largely nationalist areas such as County Fermanagh, County Tyrone, South Londonderry, South Armagh and South Down and the City of Derry to the Free State and that the remnant of Northern Ireland would not be economically viable and would eventually opt for union with the rest of the island. 

The terms of Article 12 were ambiguous - no timetable was established or method to determine "the wishes of the inhabitants".  Article 12 did not specifically call for a plebiscite or specify a time for the convening of the commission (the commission did not meet until November 1924). The northern anti partitionist (and future Member of Parliament) Cahir Healy worked with the North East Boundary Bureau to develop cases for the exclusion of Nationalist areas from Northern Ireland. Healy urged the Dublin government to insist on a plebiscite in the counties of Fermanagh and Tyrone. By December 1924 the chairman of the Commission (Richard Feetham) had firmly ruled out the use of plebiscites. In Southern Ireland the new Parliament fiercely debated the terms of the Treaty yet devoted a very small amount of time on the issue of partition - just nine out of 338 transcript pages. The commission's final report recommended only minor transfers of territory, and in both directions.

Make Up of the Commission
The Commission consisted of only three members Justice Richard Feetham, who represented the British government. Feetham was a judge and graduate of Oxford. In 1923 Feetham was the legal advisor to the High Commissioner for South Africa. 

Eoin MacNeill, the Irish governments Minister for Education, represented the Irish Government. In 1913 M acNeill established the Irish Volunteers and in 1916 issued countermanding orders instructing the Volunteers not to take part in the Easter Rising which greatly limited the numbers that turned out for the rising. On the day before his execution, the Rising leader Tom Clarke warned his wife about MacNeill: "I want you to see to it that our people know of his treachery to us. He must never be allowed back into the national life of this country, for so sure as he is, so sure he will act treacherously in a crisis. He is a weak man, but I know every effort will be made to whitewash him." 

Joseph R. Fisher was appointed by the British Government to represent the Northern Ireland Government (after the Northern Government refused to name a member). It has been argued that the selection of Fisher ensured that only minimal (if any) changes would occur to the existing border. In a 1923 conversation with the 1st Prime Minister of Northern Ireland James Craig, British Prime Minister Baldwin commented on the future makeup of the Commission: "If the Commission should give away counties, then of course Ulster couldn't accept it and we should back her. But the Government will nominate a proper representative for Northern Ireland and we hope that he and Feetham will do what is right." 

A small team of five assisted the Commission in its work. While Feetham was said to have kept his government contacts well informed on the Commissions work, MacNeill consulted with no one. With the leak of the Boundary Commission report (7 November 1925), MacNeill resigned from both the Commission and the Free State Government. As he departed the Free State Government admitted that MacNeill "wasn't the most suitable person to be a commissioner." The source of the leaked report was generally assumed to be made by Fisher. The Irish Free State, Northern Ireland and UK governments agreed to suppress the report and accept the status quo, while the UK government agreed that the Free State would no longer have to pay its share of the UK's national debt (the British claim was £157 million). Éamon de Valera commented on the cancelation of the southern governments debt (referred to as the war debt) to the British: the Free State "sold Ulster natives for four pound a head, to clear a debt we did not owe."

The final agreement between the Irish Free State, Northern Ireland, and the United Kingdom (the inter-governmental Agreement) of 3 December 1925 was published later that day by Prime Minister Stanley Baldwin. The agreement was enacted by the "Ireland (Confirmation of Agreement) Act" and was passed unanimously by the British parliament on 8–9 December. The Dáil voted to approve the agreement, by a supplementary act, on 10 December 1925 by a vote of 71 to 20. With a separate agreement concluded by the three governments, the publication of Boundary Commission report became an irrelevance. The President of the Executive Council of the Irish Free State W. T. Cosgrave informed the Irish Parliament (the Dail) that the only security for the Catholic minority in Northern Ireland now depended on the goodwill of their neighbours.

The commission's report was not published in full until 1969.

After partition
Both governments agreed to the disbandment of the Council of Ireland. The leaders of the two parts of Ireland did not meet again until 1965. Since partition, Irish republicans and nationalists have sought to end partition, while Ulster loyalists and unionists have sought to maintain it. The pro-Treaty Cumann na nGaedheal government of the Free State hoped the Boundary Commission would make Northern Ireland too small to be viable. It focused on the need to build a strong state and accommodate Northern unionists. The anti-Treaty Fianna Fáil had Irish unification as one of its core policies and sought to rewrite the Free State's constitution. Sinn Féin rejected the legitimacy of the Free State's institutions altogether because it implied accepting partition. In Northern Ireland, the Nationalist Party was the main political party in opposition to the Unionist governments and partition. Other early anti-partition groups included the National League of the North (formed in 1928), the Northern Council for Unity (formed in 1937) and the Irish Anti-Partition League (formed in 1945).

Constitution of Ireland 1937
De Valera came to power in Dublin in 1932, and drafted a new Constitution of Ireland which in 1937 was adopted by plebiscite in the Irish Free State. Its articles 2 and 3 defined the 'national territory' as: "the whole island of Ireland, its islands and the territorial seas". The state was named 'Ireland' (in English) and 'Éire' (in Irish); a United Kingdom Act of 1938 described the state as "Eire". The irredentist texts in Articles 2 and 3 were deleted by the Nineteenth Amendment in 1998, as part of the Belfast Agreement.

British offer of unity in 1940
During the Second World War, after the Fall of France, Britain made a qualified offer of Irish unity in June 1940, without reference to those living in Northern Ireland. On their rejection, neither the London or Dublin governments publicised the matter. 
Ireland would have joined the allies against the Axis by allowing British ships to use its ports, arresting Germans and Italians, setting up a joint defence council and allowing overflights. 
In return, arms would have been provided to Ireland and British forces would cooperate on a German invasion. London would have declared that it accepted 'the principle of a United Ireland' in the form of an undertaking 'that the Union is to become at an early date an accomplished fact from which there shall be no turning back.' 
Clause ii of the offer promised a joint body to work out the practical and constitutional details, 'the purpose of the work being to establish at as early a date as possible the whole machinery of government of the Union'.  The proposals were first published in 1970 in a biography of de Valera.

1945–1973
In May 1949 the Taoiseach John A. Costello introduced a motion in the Dáil strongly against the terms of the UK's Ireland Act 1949 that confirmed partition for as long as a majority of the electorate in Northern Ireland wanted it, styled in Dublin as the "Unionist Veto".

Congressman John E. Fogarty was the main mover of the Fogarty Resolution on 29 March 1950. This proposed suspending Marshall Plan Foreign Aid to the UK, as Northern Ireland was costing Britain $150,000,000 annually, and therefore American financial support for Britain was prolonging the partition of Ireland. Whenever partition was ended, Marshall Aid would restart. On 27 September 1951, Fogarty's resolution was defeated in Congress by 206 votes to 139, with 83 abstaining – a factor that swung some votes against his motion was that Ireland had remained neutral during World War II.

From 1956 to 1962, the Irish Republican Army (IRA) carried out a limited guerrilla campaign in border areas of Northern Ireland, called the Border Campaign. It aimed to destabilise Northern Ireland and bring about an end to partition, but ended in failure.

In 1965, Taoiseach Seán Lemass met Northern Ireland's Prime Minister Terence O'Neill. It was the first meeting between the two heads of government since partition.

Both the Republic and the UK joined the European Economic Community in 1973.

The Troubles and Good Friday Agreement

The Unionist governments of Northern Ireland were accused of discrimination against the Irish nationalist and Catholic minority. A non-violent campaign to end discrimination began in the late 1960s. This civil rights campaign was opposed by loyalists and hard-line unionist parties, who accused it of being a republican front to bring about a united Ireland. This unrest led to the August 1969 riots and the deployment of British troops, beginning a thirty-year conflict known as the Troubles (1969–98), involving republican and loyalist paramilitaries. In 1973 a 'border poll' referendum was held in Northern Ireland on whether it should remain part of the UK or join a united Ireland. Irish nationalists boycotted the referendum and only 57% of the electorate voted, resulting in an overwhelming majority for remaining in the UK.

The Northern Ireland peace process began in 1993, leading to the Good Friday Agreement in 1998. It was ratified by two referendums in both parts of Ireland, including an acceptance that a united Ireland would only be achieved by peaceful means.  The remaining provisions of the Government of Ireland Act 1920 were repealed and replaced in the UK by the Northern Ireland Act 1998 as a result of the Agreement. The Irish Free State (Consequential Provisions) Act 1922 had already amended the 1920 Act so that it would only apply to Northern Ireland. It was finally repealed in the Republic by the Statute Law Revision Act 2007.

In its 2017 white paper on Brexit, the British government reiterated its commitment to the Agreement. On Northern Ireland's status, it said that the government's "clearly-stated preference is to retain Northern Ireland's current constitutional position: as part of the UK, but with strong links to Ireland".

While not explicitly mentioned in the 1998 Good Friday Agreement, the Common Travel Area between the UK and the Republic of Ireland, EU integration at that time and the demilitarisation of the boundary region provided by the treaty resulted in the virtual dissolution of the border.

Partition and sport

Following partition, most sporting bodies continued on an all-Ireland basis. The main exception was association football (soccer), as separate organising bodies were formed in Northern Ireland (Irish Football Association) and the Republic of Ireland (Football Association of Ireland). At the Olympics, a person from Northern Ireland can choose to represent either the Republic of Ireland team (which competes as "Ireland") or United Kingdom team (which competes as "Great Britain").

See also

 Partitionism
 Repartition of Ireland
 Republic of Ireland–United Kingdom border
 United Ireland

References

Further reading

 Denis Gwynn, The History of Partition (1912–1925). Dublin: Browne and Nolan, 1950. 
 Michael Laffan, The Partition of Ireland 1911–25. Dublin: Dublin Historical Association, 1983. 
 Thomas G. Fraser, Partition in Ireland, India and Palestine: theory and practice.London: Macmillan, 1984.
 Clare O'Halloran, Partition and the limits of Irish nationalism: an ideology under stress. Dublin: Gill and Macmillan, 1987. 
 Austen Morgan, Labour and partition: the Belfast working class, 1905–1923. London: Pluto, 1991.
 Eamon Phoenix, Northern Nationalism: Nationalist politics, partition and the Catholic minority in Northern Ireland. Belfast: Ulster Historical Foundation, 1994. 
 Thomas Hennessey, Dividing Ireland: World War 1 and partition. London: Routledge, 1998. 
 John Coakley, Ethnic conflict and the two-state solution: the Irish experience of partition. Dublin: Institute for British-Irish Studies, University College Dublin, 2004. 
 Benedict Kiely, Counties of Contention: a study of the origins and implications of the partition of Ireland. Cork: Mercier Press, 2004. 
 Brendan O'Leary, Analysing partition: definition, classification and explanation. Dublin: Institute for British-Irish Studies, University College Dublin, 2006
 Brendan O'Leary, Debating Partition: Justifications and Critiques. Dublin: Institute for British-Irish Studies, University College Dublin, 2006.
 Robert Lynch, Northern IRA and the Early Years of Partition. Dublin: Irish Academic Press, 2006. 
Robert Lynch, The Partition of Ireland: 1918–1925. Cambridge University Press, 2019.
 Margaret O'Callaghan, Genealogies of partition: history, history-writing and the troubles in Ireland. London: Frank Cass; 2006. 
 Lillian Laila Vasi, Post-partition limbo states: failed state formation and conflicts in Northern Ireland and Jammu-and-Kashmir. Koln: Lambert Academic Publishing, 2009.
 Stephen Kelly, Fianna Fáil, Partition and Northern Ireland, 1926 – 1971. Dublin: Irish Academic Press, 2013

External links
The Partition of Ireland (Workers Solidarity Movement – An anarchist organisation which supports the IRA)
James Connolly: Labour and the Proposed Partition of Ireland (Marxists Internet Archive)
The Socialist Environmental Alliance: The SWP and Partition of Ireland (The Blanket)
Sean O Mearthaile, Partition — what it means for Irish workers (The ETEXT Archives)
Northern Ireland Timeline: Partition: Civil war 1922–1923 (BBC History). 
Home rule for Ireland, Scotland and Wales (LSE Library). 
Towards a Lasting Peace in Ireland (Sinn Féin)
History of the Republic of Ireland (History World)

Politics of Ireland
History of Ireland (1801–1923)
1921 in Ireland
History of Northern Ireland
Partition (politics)
May 1921 events
Constitutional history of Northern Ireland